Quchayuq (Quechua qucha lake, -yuq a suffix, "the one with a lake (or lakes)", also spelled Jochayo) or Rumi Cruz (Quechua rumi stone, Spanish cruz cross, "stone cross") is a mountain in Peru, about  high. It is located in the Junín Region, Concepción Province, on the border of the districts of Andamarca and Comas. It is northeast of the Waytapallana mountain range. Quchayuq lies north of Utkhu Warqu and the lake and the mountain named Putkaqucha.

References

Mountains of Peru
Mountains of Junín Region